This is the complete order of battle of Allied and Japanese forces during the Borneo campaign of 1945. As the campaign was fought in three geographically separate areas and the same air and naval units supported more than one of these battles the order of battle is split into the three areas.

Summary order of battle

Allied forces
General Headquarters South West Pacific Area
Allied Land Forces
Australian I Corps
Australian 7th Division
Australian 9th Division
Allied Air Forces
Advanced RAAF Command
Australian First Tactical Air Force
United States Thirteenth Air Force
Allied Naval Forces
Seventh Amphibious Force
Amphibious Group Six

Japanese forces
Southern Expeditionary Army Group (Saigon)
Japanese Seventh Area Army
Japanese 37th Army
56th Independent Mixed Brigade (Brunei)
71st Independent Mixed Brigade (Kuching)
25th Independent Mixed Regiment (North Borneo)
455th Independent Infantry Battalion (Balikpapan)
553rd Independent Infantry Battalion (Miri)
554th Independent Infantry Battalion (Sandakan)
774th Independent Infantry Battalion (Tenom)
Army-Navy Headquarters Tarakan
22nd Special Naval Base Force (Balikpapan)
Japanese 3rd Air Army (Singapore)
Japanese 10th Independent Flying Brigade
83rd Flying Regiment

Battle of Tarakan (1945)

Allied units ("Oboe One Force")

Ground forces
 26th Brigade Group (detached from Australian 9th Division)
 2/23rd Infantry Battalion
 2/24th Infantry Battalion
 2/48th Infantry Battalion
 2/3rd Pioneer Battalion (fought as infantry)
 2/4th Cavalry Commando Squadron
 C Squadron, 2/9th Armoured Regiment (Matilda II tanks)
 D Company, 2/2nd Machine Gun Battalion
 2/7th Field Regiment (25 pounder guns)
 53rd Composite Anti-Aircraft Regiment
 2/13th Field Company
 2nd Field Company
 2/12th Field Ambulance
 2 Beach Group
 2/2nd Pioneer Battalion
 Other units:
 2/11th Field Company
 2 Beach Workshop
 'B' Royal Australian Navy Commando
 2nd Australian Army Medical Corps Company

Royal Netherlands East Indies Army
 2nd Company, 1st Battalion Netherlands East Indies Army 

United States Army
 Composite Company, 727th Amphibian Tractor Battalion
 Company, 593rd Engineer Boat and Shore Battalion

Air units
 No. 77 (Attack) Wing Royal Australian Air Force (RAAF)
 No. 76 Squadron RAAF (Kittyhawk) (from 15 May)
 No. 22 Squadron RAAF (Beaufighter) (from 4 June)
 No. 30 Squadron RAAF (Beaufighter) (from 4 June)
 No. 31 Squadron RAAF (Beaufighter)
 No. 78 (Fighter) Wing RAAF
 No. 75 Squadron RAAF (Kittyhawk)
 No. 78 Squadron RAAF (Kittyhawk)
 No. 80 Squadron RAAF (Kittyhawk)
 No. 452 Squadron RAAF (Spitfire)
 No. 82 (Bomber) Wing RAAF
 No. 21 Squadron RAAF (B-24 Liberator)
 No. 23 Squadron RAAF (B-24)
 No. 24 Squadron RAAF (B-24)
 18th Fighter Group USAAF (Mindoro Is., Zamboanga from 4 May)
 12th Fighter Squadron (P-38)
 44th Fighter Squadron (P-38)
 70th Fighter Squadron (P-38)
 347th Fighter Group USAAF (Palawan Is.)
 67th Fighter Squadron (P-38)
 68th Fighter Squadron (P-38)
 339th Fighter Squadron (P-38)
 42d Bombardment Group USAAF (Palawan Is.)
 69th Bombardment Squadron (B-25)
 70th Bombardment Squadron (B-25)
 75th Bombardment Squadron (B-25)
 100th Bombardment Squadron (B-25)
 390th Bombardment Squadron (B-25)
 5th Bombardment Group USAAF (Samar Is.)
 23d Bombardment Squadron (B-24)
 31st Bombardment Squadron (B-24)
 72d Bombardment Squadron (B-24)
 394th Bombardment Squadron (B-24)
 307th Bombardment Group USAAF (Morotai Is.)
 370th Bombardment Squadron (B-24)
 371st Bombardment Squadron (B-24)
 372nd Bombardment Squadron (B-24)
 424th Bombardment Squadron (B-24)
 868th Bombardment Squadron USAAF (LAB-24)
 Fleet Air Wing 17 US Navy (Palawan Is.)
 Patrol Bombing Squadron 128 (VPB-128) (PV-1 Ventura)
 Patrol Bombing Squadron 106 (VPB-106) (PB4Y-2 Privateer) (from 3 May)
 Patrol Bombing Squadron 111 (VPB-111) (PB4Y-2 Privateer)
 Patrol Bombing Squadron 109 (VPB-109) (PB4Y-2 Privateer with Bat Bombs) (until 6 May)
 RAAF ground units on Tarakan during the campaign
 No. 16 Air Observation Post Flight (4 Auster light aircraft)
 No. 61 Operational Base Unit
 No. 61 Airfield Construction Wing
 No. 1 Airfield Construction Squadron
 No. 8 Airfield Construction Squadron
 No. 2 Aerodrome Security Squadron
 No. 114 Mobile Fighter Control Unit

Naval units
 Covering Group 74.3
 Light cruisers: USS Phoenix, USS Boise, HMAS Hobart
 Destroyers: USS Taylor, USS Nicholas, USS O’Bannon, HMAS Warramunga
 Attack Group 78.1:
 Flagship: USS Rocky Mount
 Landing ships: 2 LSI (HMAS Manoora and HMAS Westralia), 1 AKA (USS Titania), 1 LSD (USS Rushmore), 21 LST, 12 LCI, 4 LSM, 12 LCT
 Support: 6 LCS, 4 LCI(R), 2 LCI(M), 2 LCI(D) with four demolition units
 Screen: Destroyers: US Ships Waller, Bailey, Bancroft, Philip, Drayton, Smith, Caldwell; Frigates: HMAS Burdekin, Barcoo, Hawkesbury; Destroyer escorts: USS Formoe, Charles E. Brannon;  1 Motor Torpedo Boat (MTB) tender (USS Wachapreague), 21 MTBs
 Landing craft control unit: 1 PC, 1 LCI(L), 2 LCS
 Minesweeping unit: 1 APD, 11 YMS
 Service unit: 1 AGS, 1 AN, 1 ATR, 1 ATO, 4 LCI(L) equipped for fire fighting and salvage

Japanese units
 Army-Navy Headquarters
 455th Independent Infantry Battalion
 1 Company
 2 Company
 3 Company
 4 Company
 Machine Gun Company
2nd Naval Guard Force
 1 Company
 2 Company
 Air Defence Unit

Battle of Balikpapan (1945)

Allied units ("Oboe Two Force")

Ground forces

 7th Australian Division
 Divisional Units
 2/7 Cavalry (Commando) Regiment
 2/1 Pioneer Battalion
 2/1 Machine Gun Battalion
 B Company 2/1 Guard Regiment (4 platoons)
 Divisional Artillery
 2/4 Field Regiment (Ordnance QF 25 pounder gun-howitzers)
 2/5 Field Regiment (25 pounder guns)
 2/6 Field Regiment (25 pounder guns)
 2/2 Tank Attack Regiment 
 Divisional Engineers
 2/4 Field Company
 2/5 Field Company
 2/6 Field Company
 2/9 Field Company
 2/25 Field Park Company
 18 Infantry Brigade
 2/9 Battalion
 2/10 Battalion
 2/12 Battalion
 21 Infantry Brigade
 2/14 Battalion
 2/16th Battalion
 2/27 Battalion
 25 Infantry Brigade
 2/25 Battalion 
 2/31 Battalion
 2/33 Battalion
 I Australian Corps units 
(Attached to the 7th Division for operational purposes.)
 1st Armoured Regiment (Matilda II tanks)
 Armoured Squadron (Special Equipment) (Matilda tank specialist variant) 
 2/1 Composite Anti-Aircraft Regiment
 2 Beach Group
 2/2 Pioneer Battalion
 2/11 Field Company
 12 Aust. Light Wireless Section
 Royal Netherlands East Indies Army
 1 Company, 1 NEI Battalion
 United States Army
 727th Amphibian Tractor Battalion (less one company)
 One company, 672nd Amphibian Tractor Battalion
 One boat company, Boat Battalion, 593rd Engineer Boat and Shore Regiment

Air units
Royal Australian Air Force
 79 (General Reconnaissance – Bomber) Wing Royal Australian Air Force (RAAF)
 No. 2 Squadron RAAF (North American Mitchell)
 No. 18 (Netherlands East Indies) Squadron (North American Mitchell)
 78 (Fighter) Wing RAAF (from June 30)
 No. 75 Squadron (Curtiss Kittyhawk)
 No. 78 Squadron (Curtiss Kittyhawk)
 No. 80 Squadron (Curtiss Kittyhawk)
 No. 452 Squadron (Supermarine Spitfire)
 82 (Bomber) Wing RAAF
 No. 21 Squadron (Consolidated Liberator heavy bomber)
 No. 23 Squadron (Consolidated Liberator)
 No. 24 Squadron (Consolidated Liberator)
 Detachment, 83 (Army Co-Operation) Wing
 Detachment, No. 4 Squadron (CAC Boomerang)
 Detachment, No. 16 Air Observation Post Flight
 Detachment, No. 9 Local Air Supply Unit RAAF
 No. 54 Squadron RAF (Supermarine Spitfire)

United States Army Air Forces

13th Air Force
 42nd Bombardment Group (North American B-25 Mitchell)
 69, 70, 75, 100, 390 Bombardment Squadrons (Palawan Island)
 5th Bombardment Group (Consolidated B-24 Liberator)
 23, 31, 72, 394 Bombardment Squadrons (Samar Island)
 307th Bombardment Group (Consolidated B-24 Liberator)
 370, 371, 372, 424 Bombardment Squadrons (Morotai Island)
 868th Bombardment Squadron (Consolidated SB-24 Liberator, LAB: Low Altitude radar Bomb.) flew maritime surveillance patrols
 18th Fighter Group (Lockheed P-38 Lightning fighter)
 67, 68, 339 Fighter Squadrons (Palawan Island)
 419th Night Fighter Squadron (Northrop P-61 Black Widow) (Zamboanga and Palawan)
 4 Reconnaissance Group (Lockheed F-5 Lightning and North American B-25 Mitchell)
 17th Photographic Reconnaissance Squadron Det. (Palawan Island)
5th Air Force
 22nd Bombardment Group (Consolidated B-24 Liberator)
 38th Bombardment Group (North American B-25 Mitchell)
Attached to 42nd Bombardment Group
 90th Bombardment Group (Consolidated B-24 Liberator)
 380th Bombardment Group (Consolidated B-24 Liberator)

United States Marine Corps
 VMB-611 (North American PBJ Mitchell) flying from Zamboanga
 Marine Air Group 2 (flying from the USN escort carriers)
 Marine Escort Carrier Group 1 (MCVEG-1) on 
 VMF-511 (Goodyear FG-1D Corsair) & Grumman F6F-5N Hellcat
 VMTB-233 (Grumman TBM-3 Avenger)
 Marine Escort Carrier Group 2 (MCVEG-2) on carrier 
 VMF-512 (Goodyear FG-1D Corsair) 
 VMTB-143 (Grumman TBM-3 Avenger)

United States Navy
 Fleet Air Wing 17 (Palawan Island)
 Patrol Bombing Squadron 128 (VPB-128) (Lockheed PV-1 Ventura)
 Patrol Bombing Squadron 106 (VPB-106) (Consolidated PB4Y-2 Privateer)
 Patrol Bombing Squadron 111 (VPB-111) (Consolidated PB4Y-2 Privateer) 
 Navy Escort Carrier Group 40 (CVEG-40) on carrier 
 Fighter Squadron 40 (VF-40) (Grumman F6F-5 Hellcat)
 Torpedo Squadron 40 (VT-40) (Grumman TBM-3 Avenger)

Naval forces
 Attack Group 78.2
 Transports:  1 AGC USS Wasatch, 1 CGC, 3 LSI (HMAS Manoora, HMAS Westralia, HMAS Kanimbla), 1 AKA (USS Titania), 1 LSD (USS Carter Hall), 5 APD (Newman, Liddle, Kephart, Lloyd, Diachenko), 1 LCF(F), 22 LSM, 35 LST, 16 LCI(L),19 LCT, 2 PC, 3 SC
 Close Support: 10 LCS(L) (No. 8, 27, 28, 29, 30, 41, 43, 44, 48, 50), 8 LCI(R) (No. 31, 34, 73, 226, 230, 331, 337, 338), 6 LCI(G) (No. 21, 22, 24, 61, 66, 67), 3 LCI(M)
 Screen: 10 Destroyers (USS Robinson, Saufley, Philip, Bailey, Frazier, Flusser, Drayton, Conyngham, Smith), 5 Destroyer Escorts (USS Chaffee, L.E. Thomas, E.A.Howard, J. Rutherford, Key), 1 Frigate (HMAS Gascoyne)
 Minesweeping Group: 1 APD (Cofer), 3 AM (Sentry, Scout, Scuffle), 39 YMS, 1 LSM 
 Service, Salvage and miscellaneous units: Tugs Cable, ATR-61, Pinto, Oilers Chepachet, Sakatonchee, Gualala, Banshee, Cargo Poinsett, Repair ship Creon
 Covering Force 74
 Covering Group 74.1
 Heavy Cruiser: HMAS Shropshire (from 27 June)
 Light Cruiser: HMAS Hobart  (from 27 June)
 Destroyers: USS Metcalf, Hart
 Covering Group 74.2
 Light Cruisers: US Ships Montpelier (from 15 June), Denver (from 15 June), Columbia  (from 23 June), Cleveland (30 June – 1st? July), HNLMS Tromp (From 19 June)
 Destroyers: Conway, Cony, Eaton, Stevens, Killen, Albert W. Grant and HMAS Arunta
 Covering Group 74.3
 Light Cruisers: US Ships Phoenix (4–6 July), Nashville  (4–6 July)
 Destroyers: USS Charrette, Conner, Bell, Burns
 Destroyers: 4 from 15 June, 7 from 27 June. 
 High Speed transport: USS Schmitt, Kline (from 23 June)
 United States Navy Escort Carrier Group 78.4: (from 1–3 July)
 Escort Carriers: US Ships Suwannee, Block Island, Gilbert Islands
 Destroyers: USS Helm
 Destroyer escorts: USS Mitchell, Donaldson, Cloues, Lamons and Kyne
 8 USN PT boats arrived with the tender USS Mobjack on 27 June, and this force was expanded to two PT boat squadrons (10 and 27) on 6 July.

Japanese units
IJA 37th Army
432nd, 454th, 455th, 553rd, 554th, 774th Independent Infantry Battalions
20th, 22nd Independent Machine Gun Battalions
64th Independent AA Gun Company
307th, 332nd Independent Motorcar Company
103rd Field Road Unit
75th Construction Duty Unit
147th Line-of-Communication Hospital
37th Army MP
4th Signal Unit

IJN 22nd Special Base Force
2nd Guard Unit
995th Air Unit
103rd Air Unit
6th Shinyo Unit
2nd Harbor Duty Unit

Notes

References
 Australian Official Histories of World War II
 Gavin Long (1963), The Final Campaigns. Australian War Memorial, Canberra.
 G. Hermon Gill (1968), Royal Australian Navy 1942–45. Australian War Memorial, Canberra.
 George Odgers (1968), Air War Against Japan, 1943–45. Australian War Memorial, Canberra.
 ‘Japanese Monograph Number 26: Borneo Operations. 1941–1945’ in War in Asia and the Pacific. Volume 6. The Southern Area (Part I).
 Wesley Craven and James Cate (1953), The Army Air Forces in World War Two. Volume V: Matterhorn to Nagasaki. Government Printing Office, Washington D.C.
 Samuel Eliot Morison (1989), The Liberation of the Philippines: Luzon, Mindanao, the Visayas 1944–1945. Little, Brown and Company, Boston.
 Royal Navy (1959), Naval Staff History Second World War: War with Japan, Volume VI; The Advance to Japan. British Admiralty, London.
 Peter Stanley (1997), Tarakan. An Australian Tragedy. Allen & Unwin, Sydney.

External links
"Last Battles: The Landings", ''WW2 Australia
Borneo campaign at AWM London
Borneo Campaign at WW2 Database

.
World War II orders of battle
1945 in British Malaya
1945 in the Dutch East Indies
British Borneo
British North Borneo
Japanese occupation of the Dutch East Indies
Military history of Malaya during World War II